Matija Špičić (born 24 February 1988) is a Croatian footballer who plays for NK Kralj Tomislav.

Club career
Špičić joined NK Zagreb as a twelve-year-old. A product of NK Zagreb youth academy, he was promoted to first team in April 2006 and has been playing for the club ever since, usually as left winger. Although he was seen as one of the most talented NK Zagreb young players, his career suffered a setback when he broke his leg twice in 2008. After a period of recovery, he is now a first-team regular with the team.

As of October 2009, he has earned 33 caps and scored 11 goals for Croatia's national team at various youth levels between 2003 and 2009. and was a first-team member of the squad which participated at the 2005 European Under-17 Championship.

In June 2013 Špičić signed with Azerbaijan Premier League side Inter Baku.

Career statistics

References

External links
 
 

1988 births
Living people
Footballers from Zagreb
Association football fullbacks
Croatian footballers
Croatia youth international footballers
NK Zagreb players
SC Tavriya Simferopol players
NK Istra 1961 players
FC Sibir Novosibirsk players
Shamakhi FK players
NK Osijek players
FC Dinamo Tbilisi players
Wisła Kraków players
HNK Gorica players
NK Varaždin players
Croatian Football League players
Ukrainian Premier League players
Russian First League players
Azerbaijan Premier League players
Erovnuli Liga players
Ekstraklasa players
First Football League (Croatia) players
Croatian expatriate footballers
Expatriate footballers in Ukraine
Croatian expatriate sportspeople in Ukraine
Expatriate footballers in Russia
Expatriate footballers in Azerbaijan
Croatian expatriate sportspeople in Azerbaijan
Expatriate footballers in Poland
Croatian expatriate sportspeople in Poland
Expatriate footballers in Georgia (country)
Croatian expatriate sportspeople in Georgia (country)